The Aladagh Mountains or the Aladagh Range refers to a mountain range situated in the southeastern section of North Khorasan Province in the northeastern part of Iran southeast of the Caspian Sea. The range is located almost 25 kilometres south of Bojnurd, the capital city of North Khorasan. The Aladagh Mountains merge with the Elburz or Alborz Mountains in the west and then run southeastwards in a northwest-southeast direction. The highest peak of the range is Mount Shahjahan with an elevation of 3032 metres. This peak is located about 35 kilometres east of Esfarayen almost in southeastern part of North Khorasan Province.

Etymology

Linguistically, the word Aladagh comes  from the Turkic branch of the Altaic language family (- and, more specifically, from the Khorasani Turkic language ) and consists of two parts, ala and dagh /dag. Ala means "variegated", "patchwork",  "particoloured " or "speckled" and dagh means "mountain", and therefore the word Aladagh means "(the) variegated or speckled mountain (range)". The concept of a 'speckled mountain' is also a very common one in Ireland and Scotland, where the epithet in question is breac ( Goidelic Celtic for 'speckled or 'spotted' (see also Barmbrack )) as in the Brack and Ben Vrackie. This is hardly surprising, given the fact that combinations of varicoloured rocks, different types and densities of vegetation and cloud shadows often conspire to give mountains a piebald or speckled appearance, lending to their (already considerable) aesthetic appeal.

Geology
Geologically, the mountains were mainly uplifted in the Alpine orogeny during the Neogene and especially in the Miocene, although the orogenic phase continued in the Pliocene. The range is made chiefly of Jurassic rocks in the western, south-central, eastern and southeastern parts, with a smaller portion of Paleozoic rocks in the north-central section.

Climatology
The Aladagh Mountain Range consists of high mountains situated far from the temperate mediterranean climate of the northwestern and western mountains of Iran. Aside from the highest section of the central Elburz that has a cold mountain climate, even the Elburz Mountain Range has a generally Mediterranean climate in the eastern, central, and Western parts. But the Aladagh Mountain Range has a generally cold mountain climate. So, this cold mountain climate is surrounded on all sides by the Mediterranean climate that is prevalent in the west in the eastern Elburz, and in southeastern part of the Aladagh Range in the Binalud Mountains, and even in the northwestern, northern, and northeastern parts of the Aladagh in the Kopet-Dag Mountains.

References

Mountain ranges of Iran
Landforms of North Khorasan Province
Iranian Plateau